The West Main District is one of the five districts of downtown Louisville, Kentucky.  The district, or a portion of it, is listed in the National Register of Historic Places as West Main Street Historic District, due to its containment of some of the oldest structures in the city. The buildings of this district boast the largest collection of cast iron façades of anywhere outside New York's SoHo district. The district also features "Museum Row", a collection of several notable museums located within just a few blocks of each other.

The district, named for its main corridor of West Main Street, includes the 800-600 blocks of Main and the southern side of the 500 block.

Attractions

Many attractions are located in the West Main District.
"Museum Row"
Frazier History Museum
National Society of the Sons of the American Revolution
Kentucky Museum of Art and Craft
Kentucky Science Center
Louisville Slugger Museum
Muhammad Ali Center
Early Times Distillery
21c Museum Hotel  
Fort Nelson Park
The Kentucky Center
Riverfront Plaza/Belvedere
Actors Theatre of Louisville
KFC Yum! Center

See also
Cherokee Triangle, Louisville
Cityscape of Louisville, Kentucky
East Market District, Louisville
Geography of Louisville, Kentucky
Old Louisville
Whiskey Row

References

External links
Gallery of black-and-white photos of a nearly abandoned West Main Street in the 1970s
Main Street Association Visitors Center

Geography of Louisville, Kentucky
History of Louisville, Kentucky
Local preservation districts in Louisville, Kentucky
National Register of Historic Places in Louisville, Kentucky
Historic districts on the National Register of Historic Places in Kentucky
Museum districts